The Bayeux speeches are two speeches delivered by General Charles de Gaulle of France in the context of liberation after the Normandy landings in June 1944 and in the immediate postwar period in June 1946.

They were spoken in a public square in Bayeux (formerly Place du Château, since 1946 Place de Gaulle).

First Bayeux speech

A few days after the Normandy invasion, de Gaulle wanted to set foot on his native soil in one of the first towns liberated. He also sought to increase French (and his own) influence on the impending Allied occupation.

On 14 June 1944, he delivered a speech in Bayeux. The enthusiastic reception by the population confirmed the legitimacy of their struggle and made the United States not place France under their administration. He was able to form a provisional government after the Liberation.

Second Bayeux speech
The speech of 16 June 1946 is one of his most important speeches. Two years after the Normandy invasion, in the symbolic city, the first city in continental France liberated by the Allies, where he set foot on French soil in June 1944, de Gaulle gave a speech where he talked about the shape that the French Constitution would have to take.

When De Gaulle appeared on the balcony of the town hall in Bayeux, the public greeted him with cries of "Take power!"

De Gaulle advocated a reduction in the power of the parliament, going as far as to say, "It goes without saying that the parliament, which is composed of two chambers and exercises legislative power, cannot be the source of executive power". He said he supported a bicameral parliament with a head of state standing above the parties. In a state of emergency, the head of state would be the guarantor of national independence and the treaties signed by France.

The ideas that he put forward in his speech would inspire the 1958 Constitution.

See also
 French Constitution of 27 October 1946
 Constitution of France

References

External links
  French transcript of the second Bayeux speech
 http://mairie-bayeux.fr/index.php?id=238

Charles de Gaulle
Government of France
20th century in France
Calvados (department)
World War II speeches
Bayeux
1944 speeches
1946 speeches